Wu "Bito" Yaoxing (born 13 January 1985) is an American football manager. He managed Hong Kong side R&F in 2018.

Managerial statistics

References

1985 births
Living people
Chinese expatriate sportspeople in Hong Kong
Expatriate football managers in Hong Kong
Hong Kong football managers